State Route 189 (SR 189) is a state highway in the U.S. state of California that runs through the San Bernardino Mountains in San Bernardino County. The route travels from State Route 18 near Crestline to State Route 173 in Lake Arrowhead, serving Twin Peaks and Blue Jay along its way.

Route description
SR 189 begins at Lake Gregory Drive approximately twenty feet north of State Route 18, between the community of Arrowhead Highlands to the west and the community of Rimforest to the east. It wends its way northeastward to the community of Twin Peaks. It continues roughly eastward through Twin Peaks to the community of Agua Fria (Spanish, cold water), where it forms a tee with the northern terminus of Daley Canyon Road. It turns northeast and continues from there through the downtown section of the community of Blue Jay. It ends at State Route 173 in the Village area of the community of Lake Arrowhead.

SR 189 is not part of the National Highway System, a network of highways that are considered essential to the country's economy, defense, and mobility by the Federal Highway Administration.

History
In 1933, a road from Strawberry Peak to the road between Cajon Pass and Lake Arrowhead was added to the state highway system. It was given the number of Route 189 in 1935. The route was unchanged by the 1964 state highway renumbering.

Major intersections

See also

References

External links

California @ AARoads.com - State Route 189
Caltrans: Route 189 highway conditions
California Highways: SR 189

189
State Route 189